The Capitol Theatre was a movie palace located at 1645 Broadway, just north of Times Square in New York City, across from the Winter Garden Theatre. Designed by  theater architect Thomas W. Lamb, the Capitol originally had a seating capacity of 5,230 and opened October 24, 1919. After 1924 the flagship theatre of the Loews Theatres chain, the Capitol was known as the premiere site of many Metro-Goldwyn-Mayer (MGM) films. The Capitol was also noted for presenting live musical revues and many jazz and swing bands on its stage.

History

The Capitol was one of the first of the large lavish movie theaters that dominated the film exhibition business for the next 40 years, built by Messmore Kendall as one of New York’s first cinema palaces, through his realty company, Moredall Realty Company.

It opened on October 24, 1919 with the New York premiere of United Artists' first production, His Majesty, the American. The theater was acquired in 1924 by the entertainment magnate Marcus Loew and became the flagship of his deluxe Loew's Theatres chain.

The Capitol was the frequent site of the world premieres of films made by the Loew's-owned Metro-Goldwyn-Mayer studio. The Wizard of Oz (1939) had its first New York run at the theatre. Jerry Lewis started as an usher at the theatre.

After having been converted for the presentation of Cinerama wide screen films in 1964, the theater's last engagement was MGM's 2001: A Space Odyssey, which opened on April 3, 1968. The Capitol closed September 16, 1968 with a live all-star benefit featuring Bob Hope and Johnny Carson. The theatre was replaced by the Uris Building (now Paramount Plaza) office tower.

Radio
Airing for the first time in November 1922, The Capitol Theatre Family Show was a 45–60 minute program broadcast Mondays on the NBC Blue Network March 7, 1927 – July 27, 1931.

Leo Zeitlin (1884–1930) was a violinist, violist, conductor and impresario who was active in Saint Petersburg's Society for Jewish Folk Music. In 1923, he emigrated to New York, where he became the violist and arranger for the Capitol Theatre. In 1925, he began arranging orchestral and small ensemble pieces for the Capitol's radio program on WEAF, which became the flagship station of the NBC Radio Network in 1926.

Beginning in 1926, the series of light classical concerts titled Capitol Theatre was broadcast by the NBC Red Network on Sunday evenings from 7:20pm to 9:15pm. This series continued until 1929, not long before Zeitlin's death.

See also
Old Gold on Broadway

References

External links

Capitol Theatre at Cinema Treasures
Capitol Theatre scrapbooks, 1920-1956, held by the Billy Rose Theatre Division, New York Public Library for the Performing Arts

Movie palaces
Metro-Goldwyn-Mayer
Former theatres in Manhattan
Theatres completed in 1919
1919 establishments in New York City
Buildings and structures demolished in 1968
1920s American radio programs
Demolished theatres in New York City
Demolished buildings and structures in Manhattan
American classical music radio programs
Loew's Theatres buildings and structures
Broadway (Manhattan)
NBC radio programs
NBC Blue Network radio programs
Thomas W. Lamb buildings
1968 disestablishments in New York (state)